The Bridge of the Americas (BOTA) is a group of international bridges which cross the Rio Grande (Río Bravo) and Texas State Highway Loop 375, connecting the Mexico–United States border cities of Ciudad Juárez, Chihuahua and El Paso, Texas, via the MX 45 (known as Avenida de las Américas in its Ciudad Juárez section) from the south and the I-110 from the north, crossing the El Paso BOTA Port of Entry. The bridge is known colloquially as "Puente Libre" ("Free Bridge") in Ciudad Juárez, officially as "Puente Internacional Córdova-Las Américas" ("Córdova-The Americas International Bridge") or "Puente Internacional Córdova de las Américas" ("Córdova of the Americas International Bridge"), and also as "Puente Río Bravo" ("Rio Bravo Bridge"), "Cordova Bridge", and "Free Bridge".

Description

The Bridge of the Americas consists of two bridges comprising four separate structures: two two-lane bridges for truck traffic, northbound and southbound; and two four-lane bridges for passenger vehicles, with two sidewalks for pedestrians. The bridge is one of four international points of entry connecting Ciudad Juárez and El Paso, forming the binational metropolitan area of El Paso–Juárez, alongside the Ysleta–Zaragoza International Bridge, Paso del Norte Bridge, and Stanton Street Bridge.

History
The bridges were constructed from 1996 to 1998. The bridge is owned by the International Boundary and Water Commission, and operated in its American section by U.S. Customs and Border Protection and its Mexican section by Mexican Customs.  It is one of just five bridges connecting Mexico and the United States from Ciudad Juárez. As of 2015, it is the only one that is toll free (hence the name "Puente Libre" meaning "Free Bridge").

Border crossing

The El Paso BOTA Port of Entry is El Paso's highest volume border crossing, carrying more than half the vehicles (trucks and passenger cars) entering El Paso, Texas from Mexico.

In popular culture 
The American drama television series The Bridge (2013) is set on the Bridge of the Americas and in surrounding areas.

The bridge is featured in the Denis Villeneuve film Sicario (2015).

See also 
 
 
 
 
 List of crossings of the Rio Grande

References

External links

International bridges in Texas
International bridges in Chihuahua (state)
Bridges completed in 1998
Transportation buildings and structures in El Paso County, Texas
Road bridges in Texas
Bridges on the Interstate Highway System
Interstate 10